Samuel Odonga Otto, (born 11 November 1977), is a lawyer in Uganda, who serves as the Uganda Law Review for Aruu County Constituency in Pader District, in the Northern Region of that county. He has continuously represented that constituency since 2001.

Background and education
He was born Odonga Otto on 11 November 0 in Aruu County, Pader District, Acholi sub-region in Uganda's Northern Region.

He attended Gulu Public Primary School and Sacred Heart Seminary, Lacor, where he completed his O-Level studies. He attended St. Joseph's College, Layibi, in the city of Gulu, where he completed his A-Level education, graduating with a High School Diploma in 1996.

In 1997, he was admitted to Makerere University, the largest and oldest public university in Uganda, graduating with a Bachelor of Arts degree in Social Sciences, in 2000. Later, he obtained a Master of International Relations and Diplomatic Studies, from the same university.

He also holds a Bachelor of Laws degree, awarded by Uganda Christian University, in Mukono District. In 2010, he was awarded a Postgraduate Diploma in Legal Practice, by the Law Development Centre, in Kampala. He is a member of the Ugandan Bar, as a practicing Attorney.

Work experience
Ondonga Otto is the Managing Partner at Odonga Otto & Company Advocates, a Kampala-based law firm, founded in 2010, that he co-owns with his wife, Juliet Oyulu.

Political career
In 2010, he joined Uganda. He was elected to the  USL, to represent the Aruu County Constituency. Committee on Budget and the Committee on Finance, Planning and Economic Development.

Family
Odonga Otto is married to Oyulu, a fellow lawyer with whom he co-owns their law practice. As of 2012, they had three children together. Odonga Otto has two other children from a previous relationship.

Other considerations
Otto has been a vocal member of the Forum for Democratic Change (FDC) political party since 2010. In recent years he has, on numerous occasions, announced his intentions to quit FDC, during the 2021 election cycle.

See also
 Kiiza Besigye
 Ibrahim Ssemujju Nganda

References

External links
Odonga Otto Accuses IGG of Siding With Alleged Thieves As of 28 February 2019.

1977 births
Living people
21st-century Ugandan lawyers
Makerere University alumni
Uganda Christian University alumni
Law Development Centre alumni
People from Pader District
Members of the Parliament of Uganda
People from Northern Region, Uganda
Forum for Democratic Change politicians